The Frankish Hymnal (also called "Gallican Hymnal") is a collection of early medieval Latin hymns, most likely composed during the 6th to 8th centuries in Francia, 
recorded in a set of manuscripts of the mid-8th to early 9th century.

Manuscripts
According to Helmut Gneuss (2000), the extant texts of the Frankish Hymnal are found in the following six manuscripts, all originating in northeastern France or southwestern Germany:
Vatican Reg. Lat. 11, foll. 230v–236v, mid-8th century;
Paris B.N. Lat. 14088, 8th or 9th century; 
Paris, B.N. Lat. 13159, c. 795–800;
Paris, B.N. Lat. 528, early 9th century;
Zürich, ZB MS Rheinau 34, early 9th century;
Oxford, Bodleian MS Junius 25 (the Murbach hymnal), early 9th century.
A critical edition of the text was published by Bulst (1956).

The Frankish Hymnal is one of the regional traditions of "Ambrosian hymns", developed on the basis of the "Old Hymnal", a collection of about 15 hymns of the Latin rite which surround the core of original hymns composed by saint Ambrose of Milan in the 4th century.  Other regional traditions recognized in Fontaine (1992) are the "Milano Hymnal", the "Spanish Hymnal", and the "New Hymnal" as it developed for the use in Benedictine monasteries in the 9th to 11th centuries.

Within the Frankish hymnal, the Oxford manuscript (the Murbach hymnal) is of particular interest, as it includes a full set of Old High German glosses, likely still dating to the first quarter of the 9th century.

List of hymns
Seventeen hymns are innovations to the Frankish Hymnal (underlined below), of which six   survive into the New Hymnal.

See also
Missale Francorum (Vat. Reg. Lat. 257)

References

Walther Bulst, Hymni latini antiquissimi LXXV Psalmi III, Heidelberg (1956).
Jacques Fontaine (ed.), Ambroise de Milan: Hymnes (1992).
Helmut Gneuss, "Zur Geschichte des Hymnars", Mittellateinisches Jahrbuch 35.2 (2000) 227–247 (p. 228).
Marie-Hélène Jullien,  "Les sources de la tradition ancienne des quatorze 'Hymnes' attribuées à saint Ambroise de Milan", Revue d’histoire des textes (1989), 57–189 (86–91).
Lothar Voetz, "Murbacher Hymnen (Interlinearversion)" in: R. Bergmann (ed.), Althochdeutsche und altsächsische Literatur (2013),  272–288.

Hymnals
Hymnology
Latin-language Christian hymnals
Latin liturgical rites
Order of Saint Benedict
Christianity in Francia
8th-century poems
8th-century Latin books